Miopetaurista is an extinct genus of flying squirrel closely related to flying squirrels of today. Fossils of this species have been found from the Miocene of Europe (France, Germany) and Asia (China).

Description
Species from the genus Miopetaurista were characterized as being frugivores and granivores, which means that, in one hand, they ate primarily or exclusively fruit and, on the other hand, seeds of plants or grains. 
They were scansorial, meaning that they were capable of, or adapted for climbing, in this case, trees.

References

Miocene rodents
Flying squirrels
Miocene mammals of Europe
Miocene mammals of Asia
Prehistoric rodent genera
Fossil taxa described in 1962